Acalyptris auratilis is a moth of the family Nepticulidae. It was described by Puplesis and Diškus in 2003. It is known from the tropical montane forest of Nepal.

References

Nepticulidae
Endemic fauna of Nepal
Moths of Asia
Moths described in 2003